Goubau may refer to:

Surname
 House of Goubau, Belgian noble family
 Anton Goubau (1616–1698), Flemish painter

Other uses
 Goubau line, transmission line used to conduct radio waves